The Prime Minister of Gabon (French: Premier ministre de la République gabonaise) is the head of government of Gabon.

The position was first created in 1960, upon the country's independence from France, but was soon abolished by a new constitution adopted on 21 February 1961. It was, however, restored by constitutional amendments enacted on 16 April 1975 and was also retained in the subsequent constitution adopted in 1991. The prime minister has been the head of government of Gabon from 1960 until 1961 (under a parliamentary system) and since 1981 (under a strong semi-presidential system). The President of Gabon was the country's head of government from 1961 until 1981 (until 1975 under a presidential system without a prime minister and then under a presidential system with a prime minister).

A total of thirteen people have served as Prime Minister, twelve men and one woman.

Description of the office
The President of the Republic nominates the Prime Minister.

The President may terminate the prime minister's post, of his own initiative or by the prime minister's presentation of his or her resignation from the Government, or following a vote of disapproval or the adoption of a motion of censure by the National Assembly.

By proposal, the prime minister may nominate other members of the Government and terminate their posts.

The prime minister may stand in for the President by express authorization and for a determined agenda.

Within forty-five (45) days, after the nomination and deliberation of the Council of Ministers, the prime minister will present before the National Assembly his or her general policy program that will lead to an open debate, followed by a vote of confidence. The vote is obtained by an absolute majority of the members of the National Assembly.

The prime minister directs the actions of the Government. The prime minister assures the execution of the laws. According to the conditions of Article 20 mentioned above, the Prime Minister exercises regulatory power and nominates civil and military posts of the State. The Prime Minister stands in for the President of the Republic in the aforementioned situations. The prime minister may delegate certain powers to other members of Government.

A replacement for the prime minister is assured by a member of the Government designated by a decree of the President of the Republic, according to the order of nomination of the decree that arranged the composition of the Government.

The Minister taking over the duties of the prime minister in the interim is temporarily invested with the full rights and powers of the position.

The actions of the prime minister are to be countersigned by the members of the Government charged with their execution.

The Prime Minister is the Chief of Government.

List of officeholders
Political parties

Other factions

Notes

See also
President of Gabon
First Lady of Gabon
Vice President of Gabon
List of colonial governors of Gabon
Politics of Gabon

References

External links
World Statesmen – Gabon
1991 Constitution of Gabon (as amended in 2011)

 
Gabon
Gabon politics-related lists